PvdA–GL (Labour Party – GreenLeft) is a Dutch two party political alliance between the Labour Party and the GroenLinks, founded during the 2021–2022 cabinet formation.

History

2021–2022 cabinet formation 
During the cabinet formation, the Labour Party and the GroenLinks expressed their desire to participate in the negotiations as one formation. The parties never entered the new government, but decided to maintain cooperation among themselves.

2023 provincial and Senate elections 
The parties participated in the 2023 provincial elections separately, but in Zeeland in a single list. In some municipalities they already formed joint lists in the municipal elections a year before. As a result of the elections, the coalition of two parties became the second largest in the provincial parliaments after the Farmer–Citizen Movement. The two parties plan to create a joint Senate group after the 2023 Senate election.

Possible merger 
After the parties' announcements that they will form a single Senate group, there are rumors of a further merger of the two parties into a single party.

Criticism 
A number of concerned PvdA prominents expressed great concern in an open letter, including about people with a small budget. At GroenLinks, young people, among others, were concerned about the divergent viewpoints on sustainability and migration.

References 

Labour Party (Netherlands)
GroenLinks
2021 establishments in the Netherlands
Political parties established in 2021
Political party alliances in the Netherlands
Social democratic parties in the Netherlands